Netani Edward Talei (born 19 March 1983 in Suva, Fiji) is a Fijian rugby union player. He plays as a number eight or flanker.

Career
He represented the Fiji U21s in 2004 after earlier studying at Marist Brothers High School and two years at Wesley College (NZ). After his performance with the Stallions in 2006 in which they lifted the Colonial Cup, he joined provincial stalwarts Nadroga. Talei then got the nod for the run-on team in 2006 to help Fiji defeat Samoa 23–20 in Suva. In 2007 he was part of the 30-man Fiji squad that reached the quarter-finals of the Rugby World Cup in France. He played in three pool games before picking up and injury that ruled him out for the rest of the tournament.

Worcester Warriors snapped up Fiji international Talei during the summer, from Doncaster. The giant back row, who has won fifteen caps for his country, signed a one-year deal at Sixways, with an option for an extension.

In March 2008, Worcester opted to extend Talei's contract and he signed a new two-year deal which will keep him at Sixways until 2010.

In May 2010, Edinburgh announced that they had signed Talei on a three-year contract.

Talei moved to Newport Gwent Dragons in the summer of 2013 for the 2013–14 season. He was released by the Dragons in October 2014.

References

External links
 Worcester Warriors Profile
 Guinness Premiership Profile
 Fiji Profile
 Scrum profile

1983 births
People educated at Marist Brothers High School, Fiji
Doncaster R.F.C. players
Fiji international rugby union players
Fijian rugby union players
Living people
Rugby union flankers
Rugby union number eights
Worcester Warriors players
Dragons RFC players
Fijian expatriate rugby union players
Expatriate rugby union players in England
Expatriate rugby union players in Scotland
Fijian expatriate sportspeople in Wales
Sportspeople from Suva
Fijian expatriate sportspeople in Scotland
Fijian expatriate sportspeople in England
Expatriate rugby union players in Wales
Edinburgh Rugby players
Harlequin F.C. players